The 1910 Alabama gubernatorial election took place on November 8, 1910, in order to elect the governor of Alabama. Democratic incumbent B. B. Comer was term-limited, and could not seek a second consecutive term.

Results

References

1910
gubernatorial
Alabama
November 1910 events